Arturo Rafael Mina Meza (born 8 October 1990) is an Ecuadorian footballer who plays as a defender for Ecuadorian club Mushuc Runa.

Mina was called up for the 2015 Copa América making the cut for the final 23 this time around. On 15 November 2016, Mina scored his first international goal ever for Ecuador in a 2018 FIFA World Cup Qualification match against Venezuela, the first goal in a 3–0 victory for Ecuador.

International career

International goals

Honours

Club
Independiente del Valle
Copa Libertadores Runner Up (1): 2016
CA River Plate
Recopa Sudamericana Champion (1): 2016
Copa Argentina (1): 2016

Individual
El País (Uruguay)
El País (Uruguay) Copa Sudamericana 2016 Best 11 (1): 2016

References

External links
 

1990 births
Living people
Ecuadorian footballers
Ecuador international footballers
C.S.D. Independiente del Valle footballers
C.S.D. Macará footballers
Yeni Malatyaspor footballers
Büyükşehir Belediye Erzurumspor footballers
Mushuc Runa S.C. footballers
Ecuadorian expatriate footballers
Ecuadorian expatriate sportspeople in Argentina
Expatriate footballers in Argentina
Ecuadorian expatriate sportspeople in Turkey
Expatriate footballers in Turkey
Club Atlético River Plate footballers
Argentine Primera División players
Süper Lig players
2015 Copa América players
Copa América Centenario players
2019 Copa América players
People from Río Verde Canton
Association football central defenders